Amsonia tabernaemontana, the eastern bluestar, is a North American species of flowering plant in the family Apocynaceae, found in central and eastern North America.

Gallery

References

tabernaemontana